Eileithyia or Ilithyia ((Eleuthyia) in Crete, also  (Eleuthia) or  (Elysia) in Laconia and Messene, and  (Eleuthō) in literature) was the Greek goddess of childbirth and midwifery, and the daughter of Zeus and Hera.  In the cave of Amnisos (Crete) she was related with the annual birth of the divine child, and her cult is connected with Enesidaon (the earth shaker), who was the chthonic aspect of the god Poseidon. It is possible that her cult is related with the cult of Eleusis. In his Seventh Nemean Ode, Pindar refers to her as the maid to or seated beside the Moirai (Fates) and responsible for the creation of offspring. Her son was Sosipolis, who was worshiped at Elis.

Etymology
The earliest form of the name is the Mycenaean Greek , e-re-u-ti-ja, written in the Linear B syllabic script.

The etymology of the name is uncertain, but debated among scholars. R. S. P. Beekes suggests a non-Indo-European etymology, and Nilsson believes that the name is Pre-Greek. 19th-century scholars suggested that the name is Greek, derived from the verb eleutho, "to bring", the goddess thus meaning The Bringer. Walter Burkert believes that Eileithyia is the Greek goddess of birth and that her name is pure Greek. However, the relation with the Greek prefix  is uncertain, because the prefix appears in some pre-Greek toponyms like  (Eleutherna); therefore it is possible that the name is pre-Greek. Her name  (Elysia) in Laconia and Messene probably relates her with the month Eleusinios and Eleusis. Nilsson also believes that the name "Eleusis" is pre-Greek.

Origins
According to F. Willets, the goddess shows a clear connection to a pre-existing Minoan goddess, as well as an earlier Neolithic concept. Eileithyia's guidance in childbirth may give influence of the first midwife. To Homer, she is "the goddess of childbirth". The Iliad pictures Eileithyia alone, or sometimes multiplied, as the Eileithyiai:

Hesiod (c. 700 BC) described Eileithyia as a daughter of Hera by Zeus (Theogony 921)—and the Bibliotheca (Roman-era) and Diodorus Siculus (c. 90–27 BC) (5.72.5) agreed. Also, a poem at the Greek Anthology Book 6, mention Eileithyia as Hera's daughter. But Pausanias, writing in the 2nd century AD, reported another early source (now lost): "The Lycian Olen, an earlier poet, who composed for the Delians, among other hymns, one to Eileithyia, styles her as 'the clever spinner', clearly identifying her with the Fates, thus making her older than Cronus." Being the youngest born to Gaia, Cronus was a Titan of the first generation and he was identified as the father of Zeus. Likewise, the meticulously accurate mythographer Pindar (522–443 BC) also makes no mention of Zeus:

Later, for the Classical Greeks, "She is closely associated with Artemis and Hera," Burkert asserts, "but develops no character of her own". In the Orphic Hymn to Prothyraeia, virginal Artemis is given an epithet relating to the goddess of childbirth, making the divine huntress also "she who comes to the aid of women in childbirth":

Eileithyia is commonly in classical Greek art most often depicted assisting childbirth. Vase-painters, when illustrating the birth of Athena from Zeus' head, may show two assisting Eileithyiai, with their hands raised in the epiphany gesture.The Beauty of Durrës, a large 4th-century B.C.E. mosaic shows the head figure of a woman, probably portrays the goddess Eileithyia.

Cult

As the primary goddess of childbirth along with Artemis, Eileithyia had numerous shrines in many locations in Greece dating from Neolithic to Roman times, indicating that she was extremely important to pregnant women and their families. People would pray for and leave offerings for aid in fertility, safe childbirth, or give appreciation for a successful birth. Archaeological evidence of terracotta votive figurines depict children found at shrines, and holy sites dedicated to Eileithyia suggest that she was a kourotrophic divinity, whom parents would have prayed to for protection and care of their children. Midwives had an essential role in ancient Greek society, with women of all classes participating in the profession - many being slaves with only empirical training or some theoretical training in obstetrics and gynecology.

She was invoked by women in labour, to ease the pain of labour, and to further the birth. Callimachus recorded the hymn:

She was strongly connected with the goddesses Artemis and Hekate, the latter of whom she shared strong chthonic elements to her cult.

Achaea
Pausanias described a sanctuary to the goddess in the city of Aigion, and the cult associated with it: "At Aigion [in Akhaia] is an ancient sanctuary of Eileithyia, and her image is covered from head to foot with finely-woven drapery; it is of wood except the face, hands and feet, which are made of Pentelic marble. One hand is stretched out straight; the other holds up a torch. One might conjecture that torches are an attribute of Eileithyia because the pangs of women are just like fire. The torches might also be explained by the fact that it is Eileithyia who brings children to the light."

Aside from the sanctuary in the city of Aigion, Pausanias also noted that there were temples to the goddess in the towns of Boura  and Pellene in Achaea.

Arcadia 
Pausanias described two sanctuaries to the goddess in Arcadia, one in the town of Kleitor and the other one in Tegea. In Kleitor, she was worshipped as one of the most important deities, along with Demeter and Asklepios, and her sanctuary the most important one alongside the other two.

Argos 
Offerings were often given to the goddess Eileithyia within the ten days following a child's birth Pausanias describes a sanctuary to her in the city of Argos, and the myth associated with it: "Near the Lords [sanctuary of the Dioskouroi at Argos] is a sanctuary of Eilethyia, dedicated by Helene when, Theseus having gone away with Peirithous to Thesprotia, Aphidna had been captured by the Dioskouroi and Helen was being brought to Lakedaimon. For it is said that she was with child, was delivered in Argos, and founded the sanctuary of Eilethyia, giving the daughter she bore to Klytaimnestra, who was already wedded to Agamemnon." Pausanias noted a shrine to her i Mycenae, and an important shrine in Mases in Argolis: "[At Mases, Argos] there is a sanctuary of Eileithyia within the wall. Every day, both with sacrifices and with incense, they magnificently propitiate the goddess, and, moreover, there is a vast number of votive gifts offered to Eileithyia. But the image no one may see, except, perhaps, the priestesses."

Athens 
There were ancient icons of Eileithyia at Athens, one said to have been brought from Crete, according to Pausanias, who mentioned shrines to Eileithyia in Tegea and Argos, with an extremely important shrine in Aigion. Eileithyia, along with Artemis and Persephone, is often shown carrying torches to bring children out of darkness and into light: in Roman mythology her counterpart in easing labor is Lucina ("of the light").

Pausanias noted:

Corinth
Pausanias noted a sanctuary in Corinth: "When you have turned from the Akrokorinthos [at Korinthos] into the mountain road you see the Teneatic gate and a sanctuary of Eileithyia."

Crete 
The Cave of Eileithyia near Amnisos, the harbor of Knossos, mentioned in the Odyssey (xix.189) in connection with her cult, was accounted the birthplace of Eileithyia. In the river nearby also named Amnisos, lived nymphs that were sacred to Eileithyia named Amnisades and Amnisabes. The Cretan cave has stalactites suggestive of the goddess' double form (Kerenyi 1976 fig. 6), of bringing labor on and of delaying it, and votive offerings to her have been found establishing the continuity of her cult from Neolithic times, with a revival as late as the Roman period. Here she was probably being worshipped before Zeus arrived in the Aegean, but certainly in Minoan–Mycenaean times. The goddess is mentioned as Eleuthia in a Linear B fragment from Knossos, where it is stated that her temple is given an amphora of honey. In the cave of Amnisos (Crete) the god Enesidaon (the "earth shaker", who is the chthonic Poseidon) is related to the cult of Eileithyia. She was related with the annual birth of the divine child. The goddess of nature and her companion survived in the Eleusinian cult, where the following words were uttered: "Mighty Potnia bore a strong son."

In classical times, there were shrines to Eileithyia in the Cretan cities of Lato and Eleutherna and a sacred cave at Inatos. At a sanctuary in Tsoutsouros Inatos, two small terracotta figures, one breastfeeding and the other pregnant, have been dated to the 7th century.

Delos 
According to the Homeric Hymn III to Delian Apollo, Hera detained Eileithyia, who was coming from the Hyperboreans in the far north, to prevent Leto from going into labor with Artemis and Apollo, since the father was her husband Zeus. Hera was jealous of Zeus's affairs and tended to enact revenge upon the women. The other goddesses present at the birthing on Delos had sent Iris to bring Eileithyia forth. As she stepped upon the island, the birth began. This hymn is contradicted by Hesiod's Theogony, where Apollo and Artemis are born before Hera's marriage to Zeus, and therefore neither Hera or Eileithyia are mentioned interfering with the birth of the twins. On Delos, a shrine was dedicated to Eileithyia, and was worshipped in a mid-winter festival the named Eileithyaea. It was said by Callimachus that the hymn sung during festival was the same as that sung by nymphs at Apollo's birth. This cult likely goes back to the Archaic period, and the cult was associated with other local Delian childbirth deities associated with Artemis, Opis and Arge.

Eretriam
Archaeologists uncovered a sanctuary dedicated to Eileithyia at Eretria. The sanctuary had been placed in the northwestern section of a gymnasium.

Messene
Pausanias noted that "The Messenians have a temple erected to Eileithyia [at Messene, Messenia] with a stone statue."

Olympia
On the Greek mainland, at Olympia, an archaic shrine with an inner cella sacred to the serpent-savior of the city (Sosipolis) and to Eileithyia was seen by the traveler Pausanias in the 2nd century AD (Description of Greece vi.20.1–3); in it, a virgin-priestess cared for a serpent that was fed on honeyed barley-cakes and water—an offering suited to Demeter. The shrine memorialized the appearance of a crone with a babe in arms, at a crucial moment when Elians were threatened by forces from Arcadia. The child, placed on the ground between the contending forces, changed into a serpent, driving the Arcadians away in flight, before it disappeared into the hill.

Paros 
Eileithyia had a cult south of the Mount Kounados on the Cycladic Island of Paros, where a cave with a natural spring functioned as an informal sanctuary. Numerous artifacts have been found, such as pottery, bronze pieces, and marble plaques, which indicate use of the site from the Geometric period to the Roman period. It has been theorized that the site was used for prayers for both female and male fertility, based on the type of offerings that have been found.

Sparta 
There was a sanctuary dedicated to Eileithyia near the Sanctuary of Artemis Orthia, which Pausanias noted: "Not far from Orthia [the temple of Artemis in Sparta, Lakedaimon] is a sanctuary of Eileithyia. They say that they built it, and came to worship Eileithyia as a goddess, because of an oracle from Delphoi."

Genealogy

Notes

References

 Baur, Paul Victor Christopher, 1872. (1902). Eileithyia. University of Missouri, 1902.
 Beekes, R. S. P., Etymological Dictionary of Greek, Brill, 2009.
 Burkert, Walter, Greek Religion, 1985.
 Bury, R. G., The Symposium of Plato. Cambridge. W. Heffer and Sons. 1909. Online version at the Perseus Digital Library
 Callimachus. Works. A.W. Mair. London: William Heinemann; New York: G.P. Putnam's Sons. 1921. Online version at the Perseus Digital Library
 Gantz, Timothy, Early Greek Myth: A Guide to Literary and Artistic Sources, Johns Hopkins University Press, 1996, Two volumes:  (Vol. 1),  (Vol. 2).
 Graves, Robert, The Greek Myths, 1955.
 Herodotus, The Histories with an English translation by A. D. Godley. Cambridge. Harvard University Press. 1920. Online Version at the Perseus Digital Library
 Hesiod, Theogony, in The Homeric Hymns and Homerica with an English Translation by Hugh G. Evelyn-White, Cambridge, Massachusetts., Harvard University Press; London, William Heinemann Ltd. 1914. Online version at the Perseus Digital Library.
 Homer, Homeric Hymn to Apollo, in The Homeric Hymns and Homerica with an English Translation by Hugh G. Evelyn-White. Homeric Hymns. Cambridge, MA., Harvard University Press; London, William Heinemann Ltd. 1914. Online version at the Perseus Digital Library.
 Homer, The Iliad with an English Translation by A. T. Murray, Ph.D., in two volumes. Cambridge, Massachusetts., Harvard University Press; London, William Heinemann, Ltd. 1924. Online version at the Perseus Digital Library.
 Homer; The Odyssey with an English Translation by A. T. Murray, Ph.D., in two volumes. Cambridge, Massachusetts., Harvard University Press; London, William Heinemann, Ltd. 1919. Online version at the Perseus Digital Library.
 Kerenyi, Karl, Dionysus: Archetypal Image of Indestructible Life, English translation 1976.
 Nilsson, Martin P. (1927) 1950. The Minoan-Mycenaean Religion and Its Survival in Greek Religion 2nd ed. (Lund"Gleerup).
 Pausanias, Pausanias Description of Greece with an English Translation by W.H.S. Jones, Litt.D., and H. A. Ormerod, M.A., in 4 Volumes. Cambridge, Massachusetts, Harvard University Press; London, William Heinemann Ltd. 1918. Online version at the Perseus Digital Library.
 Pindar, Odes, Nemean 7 for Sogenes of Aegina Boys' Pentathlon with an English Translation by Diane Arnson Svarlien. 1990. Online version at the Perseus Digital Library
 Plato. Plato in Twelve Volumes, Vols. 10 & 11 translated by R.G. Bury. Cambridge, MA, Harvard University Press; London, William Heinemann Ltd. 1967 & 1968. Online Version at the Perseus Digital Library
 Smith, William, Dictionary of Greek and Roman Geography, LLD. London. Walton and Maberly, 1854. Online version at the Perseus Digital Library
 Sophocles: The Plays and Fragments, with critical notes, commentary, and translation in English prose. Part VI: The Electra. Sir Richard C. Jebb. Cambridge. Cambridge University Press. 1894. Online version at the Perseus Digital Library
 Willetts, R. F. "Cretan Eileithyia" The Classical Quarterly New Series, 8.3/4 (November 1958), pp. 221–223

External links 
 EILEITHYIA from The Theoi Project

Greek goddesses
Childhood goddesses
Children of Zeus
Children of Hera
Deities in the Iliad
Health goddesses
Metamorphoses characters
Characters in the Odyssey
Kourotrophoi
Olympian deities